The 1959 Maine Black Bears football team was an American football team that represented the University of Maine as a member of the Yankee Conference during the 1959 NCAA College Division football season. In its ninth season under head coach Harold Westerman, the team compiled a 3–3–2 record (1–2–2 against conference opponents) and finished second out of the six teams in the Yankee Conference. The team played its home games at Alumni Field in Orono, Maine. Robert Bragg and John Welch were the team captains.

Schedule

References

Maine
Maine Black Bears football seasons
Maine Black Bears football